Lanice,  (also known as the sand mason worm), is a genus of burrowing marine polychaetes (commonly referred to as "bristle worms") typically found in the littoral zone.

L. conchilega is a common sight on European beaches and in tide pools. It is easily identifiable by the tube made of very small stones, shell fragments and mud stuck together with mucus topped with a mass of short hair-like protrusions that it leaves behind after burrowing back into the sediment. It appears somewhat like a piece of thin muddy rope with a frayed end protruding from the sand. It may even appear to be a species of slender sea anemone on first appearance, although they are only very distantly related.

Species
L. arakani (Hissmann, 2000)
L. auricula (Hutchings, 1990)
L. bidewa (Hutchings & Glasby, 1988)
L. caulleryi (Holthe, 1986)
L. conchilega (Pallas, 1766)
L. expansa (Treadwell, 1906)
L. fauveli (Day, 1934)
L. flabellum (Baird, 1865)
L. haitiana (Augener, 1922)
L. marionensis (Branch, 1998)
L. seticornis (McIntosh, 1885)
L. sinata (Hutchings & Glasby, 1990)
L. socialis (Willey, 1905)
L. wollebaeki (Caullery, 1944)
L. heterobranchia (Johnson, 1901)
L. triloba (Fischli, 1900)

Habitat
Marine, brackish or  fresh water. They may be found on seamounts and knolls.

Behavior
Worms of the genus Lanice are detritivores and filter feeders.

Further reading
Bellan, G. (2001). Polychaeta, in: Costello, M.J. et al. (Ed.) (2001). European register of marine species: a check-list of the marine species in Europe and a bibliography of guides to their identification. Collection Patrimoines Naturels, 50: pp. 214–31
Day, J.H. (1967). Polychaeta of Southern Africa. Part 2. Sedentaria. British Museum (Natural History), London. pp. 459–842.
Fauchald, Kristian (2007). World Register of Polychaeta.
Glasby, C.; Read, G. (2009). Polychaeta, Myzostomida. In: Gordon, D. (Ed.) (2009). New Zealand Inventory of Biodiversity. Volume One: Kingdom Animalia.
Fauchald, K. 1977. The polychaete worms, definitions and keys to the orders, families and genera. Natural History Museum of Los Angeles County: Los Angeles, CA (USA) Science Series 28:1-188, available online at http://www.vliz.be/imisdocs/publications/123110.pdf

Terebellida
Detritivores